The Mainzelmännchen are six comedic cartoon characters used as mascots for German public service television broadcaster ZDF. They first aired on television in 1963 as a way to accommodate a government regulation disallowing confusion between advertising and content. The cartoon characters served as a transition between the two.

They appear in between ads during broadcast, in roughly three to five second clips, and often during the satirical news program Heute-show. The name is a combination Mainz, headquarters for ZDF, and Heinzelmännchen, a type of gnome common in folklore surrounding the city of Cologne. Wolf Gerlach created the characters.

The Mainzelmännchen have become quite popular across Germany. Radio dramas have been created surrounding them, as well as children's books, and numerous other kinds of merchandise.

Appearance and Actions 
The Mainzelmännchen are either wights or dwarves, and express similarities to Heinzelmännchen. They often wear a Phrygian cap, similar to garden gnomes, however they lack a beard. Their appearances often last three to five seconds, during which they perform a single short gag. They usually speak in only a few short words, in a grumbly tone. Many of the gags are presented only visually and pantomimically. Their most famous saying is the traditional greeting „Gud’n Aamd“, a dialect coloured "Guten Abend" ("good evening"). Their given names are  Anton, Berti, Conni, Det, Edi and Fritzchen.

References 

ZDF
1963 German television series debuts
German children's animated television series
Advertising characters
Male characters in advertising
Fictional German people
Corporate mascots
Cartoon mascots
Television mascots
Television characters introduced in 1963
Comedy television characters
Television shows adapted into comics
German comic strips
German comics characters